The Saint Paul Church in Portuguese, Igreja de São Paulo is a Portuguese 16th-century church in Braga, Portugal, dedicated to Saint Paul the Apostle of Jesus.

The church was built by the Jesuits, in the time of the Archbishop Bartholomew of Braga, with a pure simple facade which is in contrast to its luxurious baroque interior with a magnificent wood carving work in the altars.

See also
 List of Jesuit sites

References

Roman Catholic churches in Braga
Jesuit churches in Portugal